Kharam or Kharam Naga may refer to:
Kharam people
Kharam language

Language and nationality disambiguation pages